Oxygonia annulipes is a beetle species from the family of tiger beetles (Cicindelidae) . The scientific name of the species was first published in 1872 by Henry Walter Bates.

References

Beetles described in 1872
Cicindelidae